Nepenthes danseri (after B. H. Danser, botanist) is a species of tropical pitcher plant. It is known only from the northern coast of Waigeo Island; plants from Halmahera, the largest of the Maluku Islands, are now recognised as belonging to a separate species, N. halmahera.

Nepenthes danseri was formally described in 1997 by Matthew Jebb and Martin Cheek in their monograph "A skeletal revision of Nepenthes (Nepenthaceae)", published in the botanical journal Blumea. However, the name N. danseri had already been in use since at least 1994.

Nepenthes danseri most commonly inhabits open scrub or bare soils on ultramafic rock. Plants also occur in forest, but these do not produce pitchers, probably due to the high light requirements of this species. Nepenthes danseri has been recorded from sea level to 320 m altitude.

Nepenthes danseri has no known natural hybrids. No forms or varieties have been described.

References

Further reading

 Bauer, U., C.J. Clemente, T. Renner & W. Federle 2012. Form follows function: morphological diversification and alternative trapping strategies in carnivorous Nepenthes pitcher plants. Journal of Evolutionary Biology 25(1): 90–102. 
  Darma, I.D.P., I.P. Suendra & H.-M. Siregar 2004. BP-17: Keanekaragaman Nepenthes di Taman Wisata Alam Nanggala III, Luwu, Sulawesi Selatan. [Nepenthes diversity in Taman Wisata Alam Nanggala III, Luwu, Sulawesi Selatan.] [pp. xiv–xv] In: Abstrak: Konggres dan Seminar Nasional Penggalang Taksonomi Tumbuhan Indonesia (PTTI) Universitas Sebelas Maret Surakarta, 19-20 Desember 2003. Sisipan Biodiversitas 5(1): i–xxxii.  
  Darma, I.D.P., I.P. Suendra & H.-M. Siregar 2004. Keanekaragaman Nepenthes di Taman Wisata Alam Nanggala III, Luwu, Sulawesi Selatan. [Diversity of Nepenthes at ecotour forest Nanggala III, Luwu, South Sulawesi.] BioSMART 6(2): 126–129.  
 Harwood, P. 1998. Four Nepenthes "new to science". The Carnivorous Plant Society Journal 21: 64–65.
  Mansur, M. 2001. Koleksi Nepenthes di Herbarium Bogoriense: prospeknya sebagai tanaman hias. In: Prosiding Seminar Hari Cinta Puspa dan Satwa Nasional. Lembaga Ilmu Pengetahuan Indonesia, Bogor. pp. 244–253. 
 McPherson, S.R. & A. Robinson 2012. Field Guide to the Pitcher Plants of Australia and New Guinea. Redfern Natural History Productions, Poole.
  Meimberg, H. 2002. Molekular-systematische Untersuchungen an den Familien Nepenthaceae und Ancistrocladaceae sowie verwandter Taxa aus der Unterklasse Caryophyllidae s. l.. Ph.D. thesis, Ludwig Maximilian University of Munich, Munich. 
 Meimberg, H. & G. Heubl 2006. Introduction of a nuclear marker for phylogenetic analysis of Nepenthaceae. Plant Biology 8(6): 831–840. 
 Meimberg, H., S. Thalhammer, A. Brachmann & G. Heubl 2006. Comparative analysis of a translocated copy of the trnK intron in carnivorous family Nepenthaceae. Molecular Phylogenetics and Evolution 39(2): 478–490.

External links

Photographs of N. danseri at the Carnivorous Plant Photofinder

Carnivorous plants of Asia
danseri
Flora of Western New Guinea
Plants described in 1997
Vulnerable plants
Taxa named by Matthew Jebb
Taxa named by Martin Cheek